Reedsoceras is a genus of large discosorids (Nautiloidea) in the family Westonoceratidae from the middle and upper Ordovician of North America.

Reedsoceras was named as a genus characterized by rapidly expanding exogastric cyrtocones with unconstricted apertures and straight sutures. The siphuncle is close to the venter, which is the externally convex side of the shell, and is composed of very short, broadly rounded  segments. Structure of the siphuncle wall is unknown.

Reedsoceras seems to be derived from Simardoceras and to be more closely related to a group that also includes Sinclairoceras than to other westonoceratids, especially those with long narrowing body chambers and bent back exogastric phragmocones like Winnipegoceras.

References

 Flower, R.H.and Curt Teichert 1957. The Cephalopod Order Discosorida. University of Kansas Paleontological Contributions, Mollusca, Article 6. July 1957
 Teichert, C 1964. Nautiloidea -Discosorida. Treatise on Invertebrate Paleontology Part K. Geological Soc of America and Univ. Kansas Press.

Prehistoric nautiloid genera
Ordovician molluscs
Middle Ordovician first appearances
Late Ordovician extinctions
Discosorida